Weerasak Kowsurat is a former Thai politician. He served as Minister of Tourism and Sports in the first cabinet of Prime Minister Prayut Chan-o-cha. Pipat Ratchakitprakarn was appointed as his successor.

References 

Living people
Weerasak Kowsurat
Weerasak Kowsurat
Weerasak Kowsurat
Weerasak Kowsurat
Harvard Law School alumni
1965 births
Weerasak Kowsurat
Weerasak Kowsurat